Henning is a surname, also used as a given name, with origins in East Prussia (now part of Germany).

Henning may also refer to:

People with Henning as a surname 
 A. J. Henning (born 2002), American football player
 Andrew Henning (1863–1947), lawyer and politician in Western Australia
 Anne Henning, American speed skater
 Cameron Henning, Olympic medal-winning Canadian swimmer
Dieter Henning (1936–2007), German engineer 
 Dan Henning, American former head coach of the Atlanta Falcons
 Doug Henning, Canadian magician and illusionist
 Eva Henning, Swedish actress
 Gerda Henning (1891–1951), Danish textile designer
 Harold Henning, South African professional golfer
 Holger Henning, Swedish Navy vice admiral
 John F. Henning, U.S. statesman 
 Klaus Henning, German Judo athlete
 Linda Kaye Henning, American TV actress
 Lorne Henning, Canadian ice-hockey executive
 Megan Henning, American actress
 Paul Henning, American TV producer and writer best known for The Beverly Hillbillies
 Rachel Henning, 19th-century Australian writer
 Rasmus Henning, Danish athlete
 Sonja Henning, American basketball player
 Thomas Henning (1956– ), German astrophysicist
 Thomas Henning (director), Australian stage director, co-founder of Black Lung Theatre
 Walter Bruno Henning, German scholar of Middle Iranian languages
 Uno Henning, Swedish actor

People with Henning as a given name 
 Henning Baum, German film and TV actor
 Henning Berg, Norwegian football player
 Henning Engelsen, Norwegian Wood Carver
 Henning Fritz, German handball goal keeper
 Henning Harnisch, German basketball player
 Henning Hyllested (born 1954), Danish politician
 Henning Illies, German geologist
 Henning Jensen, former Danish football player
 Henning von Krusenstierna, Swedish admiral
 Henning Larsen, multiple people
 Henning Leo, Swedish politician
 Henning Mankell, Swedish author
 Henning May, German musician
 Henning Rübsam, German-American choreographer and director
 Henning Solberg, Norwegian rally driver
 Henning von Tresckow, German Major General in the Wehrmacht
 Henning Voscherau, German politician, former mayor of Hamburg
 Henning Wehn, German comedian based in London

Places

United States
Henning, Illinois
Henning, Minnesota
Henning, Tennessee
Henning, West Virginia

Norway
Henning, officially named Vekre, a village in the municipality of Steinkjer, Nord-Trøndelag
Henning Church, a church in the village of Vekre/Henning

German-language surnames
German masculine given names